Pristina railway station is the central railway station in the city of Pristina, the capital of Kosovo. It opened on Tirana Boulevard (formerly 'Omladinskih Brigada') in 1936, having been constructed by a French/British company. Trains calling at the station are operated by Trainkos sh.a.

The line on which the station sits is single-track, laid to standard gauge, but there is a loop at the station, allowing trains to pass there, with a second, parallel, loop lying out-of-use as of October 2016.

A daily international train runs between Pristina and Skopje (Shkup), in North Macedonia.

Pristina is also served by the larger Kosovo Polje railway station at nearby Fushë Kosovë.

Events 

During the era when Kosovo was part of the Socialist Federal Republic of Yugoslavia, the country's leader Marshall Tito occasionally visited Pristina, arriving on his personal Blue Train.

During the 1999 Kosovo War, Serbian and Yugoslav regular forces, in conjunction with paramilitaries, conducted large-scale ethnic cleansing of ethnic Albanian inhabitants of Pristina through the station. Many of those expelled were directed onto trains apparently brought there for the express purpose of deporting them to the Macedonian border, where they were forced into exile.

The station was restored by British soldiers, serving as part of KFOR, later in 1999.

Notes

References

Railway stations in Kosovo
Railway stations opened in 1936
Transport in Pristina District